Mawar is a town in Kanpur Dehat district in the state of Uttar Pradesh, India.

Transport
It is well connected by rail and road.

Geography
It has an average elevation of 118 meters (390 feet).

Cities and towns in Kanpur Dehat district